The Boddington gold mine is a gold and copper mine located  northwest of Boddington, Western Australia.

Officially reopened on 3 February 2010, the mine has now become Australia's largest gold mine, eclipsing the Super Pit. At 2018 production rates, this equates to reserves for  years of gold production and  years of copper production. That is, until  and  respectively.

As of 2022, Boddington is Australia's biggest producing gold mine.

History
A large open-cut mining operation, it commenced in 1987 and ceased mining on 30 November 2001 after the known oxide ore resource had been processed.

Partly owned by Normandy Mining (44.44%), Acacia Resources (33.33%) and Newcrest Mining (22.23%), the Normandy share was acquired by Newmont when it took over the company in 2002, while AngloGold took over Acacia.

In 2005, Newcrest sold its interest in Boddington for A$225 million, also to Newmont Mining.

A bedrock resource of almost  was identified and expansion of the facility to allow mining and processing of basement rock was approved in 2002. Construction on the expansion project began in May 2006. At the time it was projected that once the mine achieves full nameplate throughput it would become Australia's largest gold mine.

On 29 January 2009, Newmont announced that it had raised $1.5 billion to acquire AngloGold's ownership position of 33% in the mine and thus became sole owner. Now fully owned by Newmont Goldcorp, the mine reopened in 2009 after a major expansion project that increased the throughput to become Australia's largest gold mine.

In 2005, EPCM contract was awarded to Clough. In 2006, the EPCM contract was awarded to Aker Kvaerner. In 2010, ThyssenKrupp Robins had set up the High Pressure Grinding Rolls using the drive system provided by ABB. The Environmental impact statement for the most recent expansion in 2013 was developed by Strategen Environmental Consultants. Macmohan was assigned for the gold mining operations.

The official opening of the mine was on 3 February 2010, conducted by Western Australian Premier Colin Barnett.

Newmont Mining's first  at Boddington was achieved in March 2011.

The mine is within the Saddleback Greenstone Belt, an Archaean structure in the southwestern Yilgarn Craton.

Production

Gold
Annual gold production of the mine:

Copper
Annual copper production of the mine:

See also
 List of active gold mines in Western Australia

References

Bibliography

External links
 
 
 MINEDEX website: Boddington Gold Database of the Department of Mines, Industry Regulation and Safety

1987 establishments in Australia
AngloGold Ashanti
Copper mines in Western Australia
Gold mines in Western Australia
Newmont
Open-pit mines
Shire of Boddington
Surface mines in Australia